Rhacopus is a genus of beetles belonging to the family Eucnemidae.

The species of this genus are found in Europe and Japan.

Species:
 Rhacopus olexai (Hisamatsu, 1963) 
 Rhacopus sahlbergi (Mannerheim, 1823)

References

Eucnemidae
Beetle genera